Armkhi (Moxthe) is a village in Dzheyrakhsky District of the Republic of Ingushetia, located on the Armkhi or Kistinka river (Aram-khi, Kisti-khiï; , Kistetis-tskali).  The village is known for its year-round recreation resort. Armkhi is one of six rural localities constituting the Dzheyrakh rural settlement.

History 

The name of the village derives from the river Armkhi, a tributary of the Terek river. Several variations exist with regard to the meaning of the term "Armkhi". One is that the toponym derives from Ingush for "prohibited water/river"; another, that it comes from the Ingush words amr 'lake' and khi 'water'.

The hydronym Kistinka derives from one of the old Ingush ethnonyms — Kisti.
In 1745, Vakhushti Bagrationi mentions it as "Kistetian river"  as well as "Kist-Durdzukian river".

Doctor of historical sciences and archaeologist Evgeniy Krupnov states:

In 1928 a sanatorium was established adjacent to the village, making it one of the oldest sanatoriums in the North Caucasus. The modern building of the sanatorium was constructed in 1998. Recently a ski resort was built, along with a hotel, pools and a year-round recreation center.

Demography

Geography 
Armkhi village lies on the left embankment of the Armkhi River. The closest rural localities to Armkhi are Beini to the northeast, Dzheyrakh to the northwest, and Lyazhgi and Olgeti to the east.

References

Rural localities in Ingushetia